King's was a federal electoral district in New Brunswick, Canada, that was represented in the House of Commons of Canada from 1867 to 1904.

It was created by the British North America Act of 1867. It was abolished in 1903 when it was merged into King's and Albert riding. It consisted of the County of King's.

Members of Parliament

This riding elected the following Members of Parliament:

Election results

By-election: On election being declared void

By-election: On Mr. Foster's acceptance of the office of Minister of Marine and Fisheries

See also 

 List of Canadian federal electoral districts
 Past Canadian electoral districts

External links
Riding history from the Library of Parliament

Former federal electoral districts of New Brunswick